Ptenopus garrulus, also known as the common barking gecko or whistling gecko, is a species of gecko found in southern Africa.

Gallery

References

Ptenopus
Reptiles described in 1849